The 2010 FAI Senior Challenge Cup, also known as the 2010 FAI Ford Cup, is the 90th season of the national football competition of the Republic of Ireland.

The competition was won by Sligo Rovers who defeated Shamrock Rovers in the final on 14 November 2010 at the Aviva Stadium, Dublin.

A total of 47 teams competed in the 2010 competition which commenced on the weekend ending Sunday 21 March 2010. The 22 teams entered from the League of Ireland Premier and First divisions received byes into the third round stage while the remaining 25 teams entered at the First and Second round stages with 15 of these 25 teams receiving byes into the second round. These 25 teams composed of 5 League of Ireland A Championship clubs, 16 Intermediate clubs and 4 Junior clubs. As winners of the competition, Sligo Rovers earned spots in both the third qualifying round of the 2011–12 UEFA Europa League and the 2011 Setanta Sports Cup.

First round

The draw for the first round took place on 10 March 2010. Fixtures were played weekend ending, Sunday 21 March 2010.

Second round

The draw for the second round took place on 10 March 2010. Fixtures were played weekend ending, Sunday 16 May 2010.

Third round

The draw for the third round took place on 17 May 2010 on Monday Night Soccer. Fixtures were played weekend ending, Sunday 6 June 2010.

Fourth round

The draw for the fourth round took place on 7 June 2010 on Monday Night Soccer. Fixtures were played Friday 27 August 2010.

Quarter-finals

The draw for the quarter-finals took place on 30 August 2010 on Monday Night Soccer.

Semi-finals

The draw for the semi-finals took place on 20 September 2010 on Monday Night Soccer.

Replay

Final

References

External links
 Official website
 Results on rte.ie

 
2010
2